Muhamed Toromanović (born 9 April 1984) is a Bosnian handball player for RK Slavija Istočno Sarajevo.

He was the captain of the Bosnian national team.

References

External links

1984 births
Living people
Bosnia and Herzegovina male handball players
People from Cazin
Expatriate handball players in Poland
Bosnia and Herzegovina expatriate sportspeople in Denmark
Bosnia and Herzegovina expatriate sportspeople in France
Bosnia and Herzegovina expatriate sportspeople in Poland
KIF Kolding players
Wisła Płock (handball) players